Xanthaciura is a genus of tephritid  or fruit flies in the family Tephritidae.

Species
Xanthaciura aczeli Foote, 1982
Xanthaciura biocellata (Thomson, 1869)
Xanthaciura bipuncta (Aczél, 1953)
Xanthaciura chrysura (Thomson, 1869)
Xanthaciura connexionis Benjamin, 1934
Xanthaciura excelsa Aczél, 1950
Xanthaciura flavicauda Aczél, 1953
Xanthaciura insecta (Loew, 1862)
Xanthaciura major Malloch, 1934
Xanthaciura mallochi Aczél, 1950
Xanthaciura phoenicura (Loew, 1873)
Xanthaciura quadrisetosa (Hendel, 1914)
Xanthaciura speciosa Hendel, 1914
Xanthaciura stonei Aczél, 1953
Xanthaciura tetraspina (Phillips, 1923)
Xanthaciura thetis Hendel, 1914
Xanthaciura unipuncta Malloch, 1933

References

Tephritinae
Tephritidae genera
Diptera of South America
Diptera of North America